Qeshlaq (also Romanized as Qeshlāq) is a village in Sudlaneh Rural District, in the Central District of Quchan County, Razavi Khorasan Province, Iran. At the 2006 census, its population was 52, in 13 families.

References 

Populated places in Quchan County